Redhouse were a short-lived Australian rock band formed in 1975.

Biography
Redhouse included members of the former Red House Roll Band, which had begun in Geelong in the early 1970s and released a single, "Oh Lucky Man!", from the 1973 film of the same name.

Redhouse originally featured Jack Green (bass), John Dallimore (guitar), Jacques De Jongh (guitar) and Gary Crothall (drums). In July 1976, De Jongh left the band to join Hush. He was replaced by Graham Matters (vocals) and Garry Quince (guitar and keyboards).

Redhouse released one album, One More Squeeze. Two singles were lifted from the LP: "I Like Dancing" (October 1976) and "Who’s Foolin’ Who?" (February 1977).

In March 1977, Quince left to join Finch, and was replaced by Rob Riley. A third single, "Thank You", was released in August. Matters and Riley left the band later that year.

In December 1977, Green took over as manager, and the band re-formed with Dallimore, Crothall, Crothall's brother Rick on bass, and Joey Amenta on guitar. Amenta left a few months later to join the Russell Morris Band. Redhouse continued with the three members for a short time before disbanding.

Discography

Albums

Singles

References

Australian pop music groups
Musical groups established in 1975
Musical groups disestablished in 1978
Year of birth missing (living people)
Musical groups from Geelong